Jarrapellejos is a 1988 Spanish drama film directed by Antonio Giménez-Rico. It was entered into the 38th Berlin International Film Festival.

Cast
 Antonio Ferrandis as Pedro Luis Jarrapellejos
 Juan Diego as Saturnino
 Lydia Bosch as Ernesta
 Amparo Larrañaga as Purita
 Joaquín Hinojosa as Juan Cidoncha
 Miguel Rellán as Gato (as Miguel A. Rellán)
 Aitana Sánchez-Gijón as Isabel
 Carlos Tristancho as Mariano
 Florinda Chico as María del Carmen
 José Coronado as Octavio Trillo

References

External links

1988 films
1980s Spanish-language films
1988 drama films
Films directed by Antonio Giménez-Rico
Spanish drama films
1980s Spanish films